Viktor Borisovich Shklovsky (– 6 December 1984) was a Russian and Soviet literary theorist, critic, writer, and pamphleteer. He is one of the major figures associated with Russian formalism.

Viktor Shklovsky's Theory of Prose was published in 1925. Shklovsky himself is still praised as "one of the most important literary and cultural theorists of the twentieth century" (Modern Language Association Prize Committee); "one of the most lively and irreverent minds of the last century" (David Bellos); "one of the most fascinating figures of Russian cultural life in the twentieth century" (Tzvetan Todorov)

Life
Shklovsky was born in St. Petersburg, Russia. His father was a  Lithuanian Jewish mathematician (with ancestors from Shklov) who converted to Russian Orthodoxy and his mother was of German-Russian origin. He attended St. Petersburg University.

During the First World War, he volunteered for the Russian Army and eventually became a driving trainer in an armoured car unit in St. Petersburg. There, in 1916, he founded OPOYAZ (Obshchestvo izucheniya POeticheskogo YAZyka—Society for the Study of Poetic Language), one of the two groups (with the Moscow Linguistic Circle) that developed the critical theories and techniques of Russian Formalism.

Shklovsky participated in the February Revolution of 1917. Subsequently, the Russian Provisional Government sent him as an assistant Commissar to the Southwestern Front where he was wounded and got an award for bravery. After that he was an assistant Commissar of the Russian Expeditionary Corps in Persia (see Persian Campaign).

Shklovsky returned to St. Petersburg in early 1918, after the October Revolution. During the Civil War he opposed Bolshevism and took part in an anti-Bolshevik plot organised by members of the Socialist-Revolutionary Party. After the conspiracy was discovered by the Cheka, Shklovsky went into hiding, traveling in Russia and the Ukraine, but was eventually pardoned in 1919 due to his connections with Maxim Gorky, and decided to abstain from political activity. His two brothers were executed by the Soviet regime (one in 1918, the other in 1937) and his sister died from hunger in St. Petersburg in 1919.

Shklovsky integrated into Soviet society and even took part in the Russian Civil War, serving in the Red Army. However, in 1922, he had to go into hiding once again, as he was threatened with arrest and possible execution for his former political activities, and he fled via Finland to Germany. In Berlin, in 1923, he published his memoirs about the period 1917–22 under the title  (A Sentimental Journey), alluding to A Sentimental Journey Through France and Italy by Laurence Sterne, an author he much admired and whose digressive style had a powerful influence on Shklovsky's writing. In the same year he was allowed to return to the Soviet Union, not least because of an appeal to Soviet authorities that he included in the last pages of his epistolary novel Zoo, or Letters Not About Love.

The Yugoslav scholar Mihajlo Mihajlov visited Shklovsky in 1963 and wrote: "I was much impressed by Shklovsky's liveliness of spirit, his varied interests and his enormous culture. When we said goodbye to Viktor Borisovich and started for Moscow, I felt that I had met one of the most cultured, most intelligent and best-educated men of our century."

He died in Moscow in 1984.

Writer and theorist
In addition to literary criticism and biographies about such authors as Laurence Sterne, Maxim Gorky, Leo Tolstoy, and Vladimir Mayakovsky, he wrote a number of semi-autobiographical works disguised as fiction, which also served as experiments in his developing theories of literature.

Shklovsky is perhaps best known for developing the concept of ostranenie or defamiliarization (also translated as "estrangement") in literature. He explained the concept in 1917 in the important essay "Art as Technique" (also translated as "Art as Device") which comprised the first chapter of his seminal Theory of Prose, first published in 1925. He argued for the need to turn something that has become over-familiar, like a cliché in the literary canon, into something revitalized:<ref>Peter Brooker, Andrzej Gasiorek, Deborah Longworth (2011) [https://books.google.com/books?id=47AfJ0umxQ8C&pg=PA841 The Oxford Handbook of Modernism] p.841</ref>

Among other things, Shklovsky also contributed the plot/story distinction (syuzhet/fabula), which separates out the sequence of events the work relates (the story) from the sequence in which those events are presented in the work (the plot).

Shklovsky's work pushes Russian Formalism towards understanding literary activity as integral parts of social practice, an idea that becomes important in the work of Mikhail Bakhtin and Russian and Prague School scholars of semiotics.  Shklovsky's thought also influenced western thinkers, partly due to Tzvetan Todorov's translations of the works of Russian formalists in the 1960s and 1970s, including Tzvetan Todorov himself, Gerard Genette and Hans Robert Jauss.

Film
Shklovsky was one of the very early serious writers on film. A collection of his essays and articles on film was published in 1923 (Literature and Cinematography, first English edition 2008). He was a close friend of director Sergei Eisenstein and published an extensive critical assessment of his life and works (Moscow 1976, no English translation).

Beginning in the 1920s and well into the 1970s Shklovsky worked as a screenwriter on numerous Soviet films (see Select Filmography below), a part of his life and work that, thus far, has seen very limited attention. In his book Third Factory Shklovsky reflects on his work in film, writing: "First of all, I have a job at the third factory of Goskino. Second of all, the name isn't hard to explain. The first factory was my family and school. The second was Opoyaz. And the third – is processing me at this very moment."

Bibliography (English)

 A Sentimental Journey: Memoirs, 1917–1922 (1923, translated in 1970 by Richard Sheldon)
 Zoo, or Letters Not About Love (1923, translated in 1971 by Richard Sheldon) – epistolary novel
 Knight's Move (1923, translated in 2005) – collection of essays first published in the Soviet theatre journal, The Life of Art Literature and Cinematography (1923, translated in 2008)
 Theory of Prose (1925, translated in 1990) – essay collection
 Third Factory (1926, translated in 1979 by Richard Sheldon)
 The Hamburg Score (1928, translation by Shushan Avagyan published in 2017)
 Life of a Bishop's Assistant (1931, translation by Valeriya Yermishova published in 2017)
 A Hunt for Optimism (1931, translated in 2012)
 Mayakovsky and his circle (1941, translated in 1972) – about the times of poet Vladimir Mayakovsky
 Leo Tolstoy (1963, translated in 1996)
 Bowstring: On the Dissimilarity of the Similar (1970, translated in 2011)
 Energy of Delusion: A Book on Plot (1981, translated in 2007)

 Select filmography (as writer) 

 By the Law, 1926, director Lev Kuleshov, based on a story by Jack London
 Jews on Land, 1927, director Abram Room
 Bed and Sofa, 1927, director Abram Room
 The House on Trubnaya, 1928, director Boris Barnet
  The House of Ice, 1928, director Konstantin Eggert, based on the eponymous novel by Ivan Lazhechnikov
 Krazana, 1928, director Kote Mardjanishvili, based on the novel The Gadfly by Ethel Lilian Voynich
 Turksib, documentary, 1929, director Viktor Alexandrovitsh Turin
 Amerikanka (film), 1930, director Leo Esakya
 The Horizon, 1932, director Lev Kuleshov
 Minin and Pozharsky, 1939, director Vsevolod Pudovkin
 The Gadfly, 1956, director Aleksandr Faintsimmer, based on the eponymous novel by Ethel Lilian Voynich
 Kazaki, 1961, director Vasili Pronin

Interviews

 Serena Vitale: Shklovsky: Witness to an Era, translated by Jamie Richards, Dalkey Archive Press, Champaign, London, Dublin, 2012  (Italian edition first pub. in 1979). The interview by Vitale is arguably the most important historical document covering the later years of Shklovsy’s life and work.

References

External links
 An excerpt from Bowstring in Asymptote
 The Formalist’s Formalist: On Viktor Shklovsky by Joshua Cohen
 Reading Viktor Shklovsky with a little bit about Jonathan Franzen by Martin Riker, Context #13
 An excerpt from the essay "Art as Technique" (An alternate translation of "Iskusstvo kak priyom")
 Biography in "Энциклопедия Кругосвет" (in Russian)
 Shklovsky's "Monument to a Scientific Error", translation available online at David Bordwell's site.
  The Trotsky-Shklovsky Debate: Formalism versus Marxism. International Journal of Russian Studies'' 6 (January 2017): 15–27.
 Victor Shklovsky and Roman Jacobson. Life as a Novel documentary film by Vladimir Nepevny

1893 births
1984 deaths
Socialist Revolutionary Party politicians
Writers from Saint Petersburg
Russian formalism
Russian Jews
Russian literary critics
Russian people of German descent
Soviet screenwriters
Male screenwriters
Soviet literary historians
Soviet male writers
20th-century Russian male writers
Russian military personnel of World War I
People of the Russian Civil War
Film theorists